The Belton Chalets are a group of historic hotel buildings in the village of West Glacier, Montana, near the western entrance to Glacier National Park. The chalet buildings were built in 1910-11 by the Great Northern Railway (GN) as the first component of the railroad's ambitious program of hotel, road, and trail construction in Glacier. The buildings featured a "Swiss Chalet" architectural style that set the style for much of the Great Northern's building program in Glacier. Ultimately, the site included five buildings, including a dining hall and a hotel facility.

During the 1910s and 1920s the Belton Chalet was operated by the Glacier Park Hotel Company, the GN subsidiary responsible for the railroad's concession operations in Glacier. The property was less successful than the GN's other Glacier facilities, however, probably due to its remoteness from the park's other railway-operated hotels, and by the 1930s it saw only intermittent use. The railway sold the chalet buildings in 1946, and the main hotel building stood empty for most of the next five decades, while a cafe and bar intermittently operated in the old dining hall. In 1997, the property was acquired by new owners who undertook a $1 million restoration of the entire complex, and the hotel reopened beginning with the 1998 summer season. The chalet buildings, together with other sites were included in the National Historic Landmark designation of Great Northern Railway Buildings in 2000.

See also 
Great Northern Railway Buildings

References 

Djuff, Ray, and Chris Morrison. View with a Room: Glacier's Historic Hotels and Chalets. Helena, Montana: Farcountry Press, 2001. .
 Ober, Michael J. "Enmity and Alliance: Park Service-Concessioner Relations in Glacier National Park, 1892-1961." MA Thesis, University of Montana, 1973.

National Historic Landmarks in Montana
Hotel buildings on the National Register of Historic Places in Montana
National Register of Historic Places in Glacier National Park
Great Northern Railway (U.S.) hotels
Hotel buildings completed in 1907
Rustic architecture in Montana
Tourist attractions in Flathead County, Montana
Individually listed contributing properties to historic districts on the National Register in Montana
National Register of Historic Places in Flathead County, Montana
1907 establishments in Montana
Swiss Chalet Revival architecture